Gustav Horn may refer to:

 Gustav Horn, Count of Pori (1592–1657), Swedish/Finnish soldier and politician
 Gustav Evertsson Horn (1614–1666), Finnish-Swedish military and politician